The Best of Apocalyptica is a Greatest hits album released in 2002 by the cello metal group Apocalyptica. It contains covers from their previous releases and was only released in Japan.

Track listing

Notes
 This song would later be released on the album Reflections titled as "Drive".  
 These songs are from the album Cult.
 These songs are from the album Plays Metallica by Four Cellos.
 These songs are from the album Inquisition Symphony.

Credits

Apocalyptica
Eicca Toppinen – cello
Perttu Kivilaakso – cello
Paavo Lötjönen – cello

Additional personnel
Max Lilja – cello (2-13) 
Antero Manninen – cello (3, 4, 7, 8, 10 & 12)

References

Apocalyptica albums
2002 greatest hits albums